Lee Cartwright (born 19 September 1972) is a retired footballer who made over 400 league appearances for Preston North End.

Children 3:
1 son and 2 twin daughters.

Early years
Born in Rawtenstall, Rossendale, Lancashire, Cartwright was signed from school as a trainee in 1989 by North End boss John McGrath. Under McGrath's successor, Les Chapman, he made his first team debut at the age of 18 in a 1–0 home win against Shrewsbury Town in March 1991. Having broken into the first team, Cartwright remained a regular for the rest of the season.

In the following season, 1991–92, he missed only a handful of matches as he picked up the club's player of the year award as reward for a string of consistently good displays. In 1992-93, Preston were relegated from the Football League Second Division, although Cartwright's performances attracted interest from both Oldham Athletic and Blackpool. Persuaded to stay by new manager John Beck, Cartwright would remain at Deepdale for the next eleven years.

A Preston legend
In his thirteen years at the club, Cartwright became a North End legend making a total of 472 appearances for the club, scoring 30 goals. He was an important member of the Preston teams that won the 1995–96 Third Division title and 1999–2000 Second Division title. Cartwright also played in the 1993–94 Third Division and 2000–01 First Division play-off final defeats.

After Preston
In January 2004, Cartwright moved to Stockport County on a free transfer, where his 18-month stay was disrupted by injury, and then to Rochdale, where injuries limited him to 29 appearances before he was released.

Cartwright joined Conference North side Scarborough for the 2006–07 season, where he won the club's last Player of the Year award before their liquidation.

Cartwright signed for Hyde United for the 2007-08 Conference North season, before retiring from football.

References

1972 births
Living people
People from Rawtenstall
English footballers
Preston North End F.C. players
Stockport County F.C. players
Rochdale A.F.C. players
Scarborough F.C. players
Hyde United F.C. players
Association football midfielders